Homecoming with Rick Reilly is an American television show on the sports network ESPN. The show is hosted by ESPN personality Rick Reilly, and features interviews with popular American sports figures.

Interview subjects 
Josh Hamilton
Jerry Rice
Kurt Warner
Tony Hawk
John Elway
Joe Mauer
Michael Phelps
Alonzo Mourning
Chris Paul
Dwyane Wade
Landon Donovan
Emmitt Smith
Donovan McNabb (aired September 14, 2010)
Earvin "Magic" Johnson, Jr. (air date December 14, 2010)

American sports television series